Buena Vista (foaled 14 March 2006) is a Japanese Thoroughbred racehorse who was the 2010 Japanese Horse of the Year after winning the first two races in the Japanese Fillies Triple Crown.

Pedigree

External links 
Buena Vista Pedigree
Buena Vista racing stats 

2006 racehorse births
Racehorses bred in Japan
Racehorses trained in Japan
Thoroughbred family 16-c
Japan Cup winners